The Monopisthocotylea are a subclass of parasitic flatworms in the class Monogenea.

Classification
There are only two subclasses in the class Monogenea:
 Monopisthocotylea. The name means "a single posterior sucker" - the attachment organ (the haptor) is simple. 
 Polyopisthocotylea. The name means "several posterior suckers" - the attachment organ (the haptor) is complex, with several clamps or suckers. 

The subclass Monopisthocotylea contains these orders:
 Order Capsalidea
 Order Dactylogyridea
 Order Gyrodactylidea
 Order Monocotylidea
 Order Montchadskyellidea

Example of species

 Entobdella soleae, a capsalid from the sole Solea solea off the United Kingdom
 Gyrodactylus salaris, a gyrodactylid, or "salmon fluke", a deadly parasite of salmon in Norway
 Calydiscoides euzeti, a diplectanid from the emperor, Lethrinus rubrioperculatus
Pseudorhabdosynochus epinepheli, a diplectanid from groupers, and many other species of Pseudorhabdosynochus
Cichlidogyrus evikae and many other species of the genus Cichlidogyrus, which are parasites on the gills of cichlid fish

References

External links

 
Protostome subclasses